Al-Shuaibi is an Arabic surname that denotes a relationship to Shuaib, a prophet of the Quran. Notable people with the surname include:
 Amjad Al-Shuaibi (born 1979), Jordanian footballer of Palestinian origin
 Haya Al Shuaibi (born 1979), Saudi comedian actress

Arabic-language surnames
Surnames of Saudi Arabian origin